Sir Alfred Clarke Turnbull  (14 October 1881 – 17 September 1962) was a New Zealand colonial administrator who served as Administrator of Western Samoa and Tokelau between 1935 and 1946.

Biography
Turnbull was born in Balclutha in 1881. He joined the civil service in 1899, initially working in the Lands & Survey Department, before becoming Chief Accountant in 1912 and an inspector in 1915. He served in the New Zealand Expeditionary Force between 1916 and 1919. When he returned from the war, he was appointed secretary to the Public Service Commissioner. In 1921 he married Grace Moncrieff.

He was posted to Western Samoa in 1930, initially as Government Secretary. In 1935 he was appointed Acting Administrator, succeeding Herbert Ernest Hart. Turnbull was a popular figure in Samoa, and a petition was sent to the New Zealand government requesting his appointment. However, his position was not made permanent until 1943. He remained in office until 1946, when he retired and was replaced by Francis William Voelcker. He was appointed a Knight Commander of the Order of the British Empire in the 1946 New Year Honours.

Following his retirement, Turnbull relocated to the United States where his daughter lived. He died in Stamford Hospital, Connecticut, in 1962.

References

1881 births
New Zealand military personnel of World War I
Samoan civil servants
Administrators of the Western Samoa Trust Territory
Administrators of Tokelau
New Zealand Knights Commander of the Order of the British Empire
New Zealand emigrants to the United States
1962 deaths
People from Balclutha, New Zealand
New Zealand public servants